The Greater Antillean nightjar has been split into the following two species:

Cuban nightjar (Antrostomus cubanensis)
Hispaniolan nightjar (Antrostomus ekmani)

Birds by common name